The 2015 UNAF U-20 Tournament was the 9th edition of the UNAF U-20 Tournament. The tournament took place in Tunisia, from 9 to 14 June 2015.

Participants
 (hosts)

 (invited)

Tournament

Matches

Champions

References

2015 in African football
UNAF U-20 Tournament
UNAF U-20 Tournament